Masakage (written: 政景, 正景 or 昌景) is a masculine Japanese given name. Notable people with the name include:

, Japanese daimyō
, Japanese samurai
, Japanese samurai
, Japanese samurai

Japanese masculine given names